Pseudepicorsia is a genus of moths of the family Crambidae.

Species
Pseudepicorsia boliviensis Munroe, 1964
Pseudepicorsia flavidensalis (Warren, 1889)
Pseudepicorsia septentrionis Munroe, 1964
Pseudepicorsia trispinalis (Amsel, 1956)

References

Natural History Museum Lepidoptera genus database

Pyraustinae
Crambidae genera
Taxa named by Eugene G. Munroe